WUE may refer to:

 Water usage effectiveness
 Western Undergraduate Exchange